Ezra Butler (born 20 November 1984) is an American football linebacker who is currently a free agent.

Football career
Butler played college football at Nevada.

He was signed by the San Francisco 49ers as an undrafted free agent on 2008 and would later spend the 2009 season with the Las Vegas Locomotives.

Butler who had signed with the New York Jets in January 2010, was later waived by the team on 29 July 2010. He was waived by the Saints on 5 September 2011.

On 9 January 2014, Butler signed with the Toronto Argonauts of the Canadian Football League. On 21 May 2014, Butler was placed on the retired list.

On 7 October 2014, Butler was signed to a practice roster agreement with the Argonauts. On 4 November 2014, Butler was released by the Argonauts.

Personal life
In 2008, he was arrested on misdemeanor charges of driving under the influence and possession of marijuana. He is now a defensive coach at West Hills High School in Santee, California. He is the son of Jonathan Butler, a two-time Grammy nominated guitarist, songwriter and music producer.

References

External links
Nevada Wolf Pack bio

1984 births
Living people
Sportspeople from Cape Town
Players of American football from Los Angeles
South African players of American football
American football linebackers
Nevada Wolf Pack football players
San Francisco 49ers players
Las Vegas Locomotives players
New York Jets players